Zarjaz may refer to:
Zarjaz, an invented slang word in 2000 AD meaning "excellent" 
Zarjaz, a 1986 shoot'em up released by Ariolasoft/Reaktör Software for the Commodore 64
Zarjaz, a 2000 AD fanzine
Zarjazz, a 1980s record label started by Madness and named after the slang word